This is a list of Belgian Academy Award winners and nominees. This list details the films and performances of Belgian actors and actresses that have either been nominated for, or have won an Academy Award (The Oscars). This list is current as of the 95th Academy Awards ceremony held on 12 March 2023.

Best Actress

Note: With her Best Actress nomination for the 2014 Belgian film Two Days, One Night, French actress Marion Cotillard became the first actor to be nominated for an Academy Award for a Belgian film.

Best International Feature Film

Best Animated Feature Film

Best Documentary Film

Best Live Action Short Film

Best Animated Short Film

Best Cinematography

Jean Hersholt Humanitarian Award

Nominations and Winners

See also

 Cinema of Belgium
 List of Belgian submissions for the Academy Award for Best Foreign Language Film

References

Lists of Academy Award winners and nominees by nationality or region
Academy Award winners